Stimmkreis München-Schwabing is a electoral district for the Landtag of Bavaria located in Schwabing and Maxvorstadt, Munich, Bavaria, Germany.

Maxvorstadt